The Bosnia and Herzegovina national rugby sevens team is the national rugby sevens side representing Bosnia and Herzegovina. For the 2022 season, the team played in the Rugby Europe Sevens Conference 1.

Results
2008
 7 - 5  2008 Zagreb Sevens (31 May - 1 June)

2009
 24 - 12  2009 Split Sevens (30–31 May)
 28 - 0  2009 Split Sevens (30–31 May)

See also
Rugby union in Bosnia and Herzegovina
Bosnia and Herzegovina national rugby union team

References

Rugby union in Bosnia and Herzegovina
National rugby sevens teams